Leopold Markbreit (March 13, 1842 – July 27, 1909) was a German-American Republican politician in Cincinnati, Ohio.  The half-brother of Frederick Hassaurek, Markbreit was a lawyer who was briefly the law partner of Rutherford B. Hayes.  President Ulysses S. Grant appointed him Minister to Bolivia in 1869.  He later served as Mayor of Cincinnati from 1908-1909.

He served as a presidential elector in 1896 for McKinley and Hobart.

References

1842 births
1909 deaths
Politicians from Cincinnati
Mayors of Cincinnati
American people of German descent
1896 United States presidential electors
Ohio Republicans
Burials at Spring Grove Cemetery
19th-century American diplomats